Essey-lès-Nancy (literally Essey near Nancy) is a commune in the Meurthe-et-Moselle department in north-eastern France.

Population

See also
 Communes of the Meurthe-et-Moselle department

References

Esseylesnancy
Leuci